Spinomantis bertini is a species of frog in the mantellid subfamily Mantellinae, endemic to Madagascar.

Taxonomy
This species was described in the genus Gephyromantis by Guibé in 1947. It was transferred to the genus Mantidactylus by Blommers-Schlösser in 1979. Dubois put it in the subgenus Spinomantis, which was elevated to genus-level in 2006.

Distribution and habitat
It inhabits crevices among boulders and rocky areas, usually close to flowing waters, in pristine forest habitats; the species is not found in degraded forests or secondary growth.

Conservation
The species is classified as Near Threatened by the IUCN. It is under pressure from habitat loss through expansion of agriculture, timber and coal production, and settlements, as well as the spread of invasive plants like eucalypts.

References

bertini
Endemic frogs of Madagascar
Amphibians described in 1947
Taxa named by Jean Marius René Guibé
Taxonomy articles created by Polbot